Jasmine Todd (born December 23, 1993) is an American track and field athlete who competes in the long jump and short sprinting events.

She competed for the Oregon Ducks college team and has won several NCAA All-American honours. She was third in the 100 m and fourth in the long jump at the USA Outdoor Track and Field Championships in 2015.

Prep
Jasmine Todd was born to Larry and Kim Todd in San Diego, California and raised in Chandler, Arizona. She grew up in a sporting family, as both her parents had been track athletes at college. She too took up track and field and while at Chandler High School she won titles in the long jump, triple jump and 100-meter dash.

Jasmine Todd claimed seven individual titles as Chandler Wolves swept four straight Arizona Interscholastic Association team crowns during her prep career. Todd won three straight AIA triple jump titles (2009, 2010, 2011) and two straight long jump crowns (2010, 2011).

Todd as a senior in 2012 prior to her injury, recorded a high school best  in the long jump, which ranked 8th nationally among high school athletes.

As a junior in 2011, Todd set the Arizona record in the triple jump  in 2011. That was the No. 5 prep triple jump nationally in 2011.

That was the 8th-best mark nationally among high school track and field student-athletes in 2010. Todd claimed AIA 100 meter state title.

As a freshman in 2009, Todd won AIA triple jump state title. Todd claimed AIA 100 meter state division I title.

High School Bests: 100 meters – 11.64w, 2011; Long jump – , 2012; Triple jump – , 2011; 60 metres – 7.42 (i), 2012.

Oregon
She began a psychology major at the University of Oregon but missed most of the 2012 and 2013 collegiate track seasons due to an injury.

Todd quickly established herself among the nation's top collegiate athletes in 2014. At the 2014 NCAA Division I Indoor Track and Field Championships she was sixth in the long jump and third in the 60-meter dash with a best of 7.16 seconds. This time ranked her in the top fifteen athletes globally for the year. She won the 100 m dash at the Mt. SAC Relays with a personal record of 11.25 seconds and won the 4×100-meter relay with an Oregon team of Marybeth Sant, Phyllis Francis and Jenna Prandini. She placed fourth in the long jump at the Pac-12 Conference championships. She improved her long jump best to  that year, placing her in the global top thirty for the season.

Todd was again third in the 60 m dash at the 2015 NCAA Indoor Championships, but managed only eleventh in the long jump. She also won the regional Mountain Pacific Sports Federation title in the 60 m dash. At that year's Pac-12 championships she won the 100 m and triple jump – in a best of  – as well as coming runner-up in the long jump. She was eliminated in the semi-finals of the 100 m at the 2015 NCAA Division I Outdoor Track and Field Championships, but placed well in the long jump, taking fourth. The Oregon Ducks team was disqualified in the relay final. She hit new heights at the 2015 USA Outdoor Track and Field Championships, established herself as one of the country's best track and field performers. She came a surprise third in the 100 m in a new best of 10.92 seconds. These placings brought her selection for both events at the 2015 World Championships in Athletics.

Todd graduated in May 2016 from Oregon and finished her career in a Duck uniform after the team won outdoor track and field Pac-12 Conference title.

Professional career
In October 2016, Jasmine Todd joined Altis in Phoenix. In 2022, Todd joined Citius Mag.

Personal records
 100-meter dash – 10.92 seconds (2015)
 200-meter dash – 22.89 seconds (2015)
 Long jump –  (2015)
 Triple jump –  (2015)
 60-meter dash indoor – 7.15 seconds (2015)
 200-meter dash indoor – 23.87 seconds (2014)
 Long jump –  (2014)
 Triple jump –  (2015)

References

External links
 College results at TFRRS
 Jasmine Todd's 2016 Oregon profile

1993 births
Living people
Sportspeople from Chandler, Arizona
American female long jumpers
American female sprinters
African-American female track and field athletes
Oregon Ducks women's track and field athletes
World Athletics Championships athletes for the United States
World Athletics Championships medalists
21st-century African-American sportspeople
21st-century African-American women